Actual Art is a genre of art that was first named by critic Alfred Frankenstein of the San Francisco Chronicle in a review of Helene Aylon’s work.  The name was chosen because the art was "real", but the term realism was already in use. Frankenstein described Aylon's work as a genre of art that involves “the self-conscious enlistment of the forces of nature, by artists, toward the completion of their art”. Collaboration with nature necessarily brings the dimension of time into as an integral component of the artworks, with some requiring many thousands of years for their completion. The artists consider the future of the work to be as important as its present, relinquishing control over the work to nature.

History
In 1982, the Actual Art Foundation formed in the Tribeca district of New York City to promote exclusively artists working in the Actual Art genre, and in 1985, obtained its 501-C3 not-for-profit tax-exempt status to fund exhibitions of Actual Art and projects proposed by Actual Artists.  The most notable early exhibitions sponsored by the Actual Art Foundation were:

 "It's About Time" at the New York City Gallery in 1983
 "Time Will Tell" at Squibb International, Princeton, NJ in 1984
 "Slow Kinetic Art" at the Wadsworth Athenium, Hartford, CT
 "Time Waits..." co-sponsored with Johannes, 11th Prince of Thurn and Taxis and his wife Gloria at Schloss St. Emmeram in Regensburg, Bavaria, Germany.

The "Time Will Tell" exhibit was documented in articles appearing in the New York Times, the Bergen County Record, the Princeton Packet, and the Trentonian.

The headquarters of Actual Art Foundation was also used for an episode of Law & Order circa 1990, featuring Actual Art. Actual Art Foundation lost its Tribeca headquarters in the attacks of 9/11 and created an Art Center at Candlewood Lake in Connecticut

About
In Actual Art, what future generations will see is programmed into the work, making time an element of the work, as well as space, form or color. The artists introduce time as a tool in the making of art. Actual Art is about energy; specifically, about the energy and life in the materials. Words like “decay”, “deterioration” or “destruction” are replaced with “change”. Tery Fugate-Wilcox is quoted as saying, “The work will last forever, as long as you understand it changes.” Actual Art moves one to think about ways to work with nature instead of fighting it. In place of the constant attempts to inhibit materials’ natural tendency to change (to the detriment of the planet), man might be examining and exploiting the inherent qualities of the materials we work with. Actual Artists have a visionary sense of the natural order of the material world.

Artists
Helene Aylon, whose work employing the qualities of linseed oil to “bleed” into patterns or form a “skin”,  prompted the naming of the genre by Alfred Frankenstein; "'Actualism' because 'Realism' is already taken."
Michelle Brody, who suspended living plants in long, hanging tubes of water;
Maria Ceppi, of Switzerland, grew grass in patterns on canvas & scented soap paintings;
Gregg Degn, using gunpowder, lead, explosives & fuses to make intricate & evolving paintings & sculpture;
 Dan Dempster, of Bermuda, who took his drawings beneath the sea, to allow the salt water to etch his drawings into steel & whose work was reviewed in American Mensa 
Robert DuGrenier, whose hand-blown glass pieces are permanently part of the trees, as they grow into and become one with the sculptures;   hand-blown glass "sea" shells, that living hermit crabs move into and take as their homes; and a glass beehive, that is home to thousands of Italian honey bees who busy themselves making wax & honey sculptures, as programmed into the construction of the hive, by the artist.
James Horton, who used the materials of photography as a painting medium.
Nathan Slate Joseph, of Israel, making gigantic wall pieces of pigmented & galvanized steel that have weathered over many years; Joseph was commissioned to create all of the art, including major indoor & outdoor installations by the King David Dan Hotel in Elat, Israel.
Yutaka Kobayashi, of Japan, imbedding rust in handmade paper or concrete & stone sculptures;
Elaine Lorenze, with living plants in concrete;
David Myers, put lead shot in enclosed, tilting table, making endless patterns; 
Alexia Nikov, of Russia, whose metallic paintings change over time from the effects of patinas & the environment; 
Tony Reason, of England, who works with rust in encaustic on linen;
Richard Thatcher, encasing uranium, transmuting to lead, in exquisite metal boxes;
 Merrill Wagner, using steel, allowed to rust in patterns, slate & rocks, weathered with pigments;
Terry Ward, declared an important new Actual Art-ist by key movement leader Tery Fugate-Wilcox during Ward's solo art exhibit in the World Trade Center / World Financial Center complex.
Tery Fugate-Wilcox, uses water-soluble paint & rain to make ever-changing painting on canvas; 

Called the “Avatar of Actualism” He uses rain to make paintings of water-soluble paint; shotguns, explosives & lightning; dust in “dust drawings”; metals that oxidize, or diffuse together over thousands of years, the actuality of any material. His work is in the collections of the Guggenheim, the Museum of Modern Art in New York, the Wadsworth Athenium in Hartford, Connecticut, the National Gallery of Australia, and a  sculpture purchased by the City of New York for J. Hood Wright Park.

Other galleries exhibiting Actual Art include:
John Gibson Gallery, (Donald Lipsky & Eve Andree Laramee);
Sandra Gehring Gallery, (William Anastasi & Dove Bradshaw Thomas McEvilley)

Other artists generally included in the genre of Actual Art or "Actualism", include:
Andy Goldsworthy
Forrest Myers
Allen Sonfist
Cheryl Safren

Perhaps the most ambitious work of art envisioned by an Actual artist is the San Andreas Fault Sculpture Project, proposed by Tery Fugate-Wilcox, which the Actual Art Foundation has committed to sponsoring.

References
 This article incorporates text from About Us, which has been released into the public domain.

References: Books
Six Years: The Dematerialization of the Art Object from 1966 to 1972 by Lucy Lippard, publ. University of California Press, 1973
Super Sculpture, New York: by Diana Chicure & Thelma Stevens, publ. Van Nostrand, 1974
Natural Phenomenon as Public Monuments by Alan Sonfist, publ. Neuberger Museum Press, 1978
Clockwork: Timepieces by Artists, Architects, & Industrial Designer by MIT List Visual Arts, 1989 (Specifically: "In New York City, an internal clock is physically inherent in the materials employed by Fugate-Wilcox in the construction of his many Diffusion Pieces.")
Andy Goldsworthy: a Collaboration with Nature, by Andy Goldsworthy, publ. H.N. Abrams, 1990
Studio International by Medical Tribune Group, publ. Univ.of Michigan, 1992
Mutiny and the Mainstream: Talk that Changed Art, by Judy Seigal, publ. Midmarch Art Press, 1992 (Specifically: "[Lawrence] Alloway included Helene Aylon here, showing two stages of her 'paintings that change in time'.")
Time and Materials by Merrill Wagner, publ. University Press, 1994
Dan Dempster: Waterworks, 1990–1997, by Peter Barton, publ. Peninsula Fine Arts, 1997
Originals: American Women Artists, by Eleanor C. Munro, publ. De Capa Press, 2000
The Art of Dove Bradshaw: Nature, Change & Indeterminancy, by Thomas McEvilly, publ. Mark Batty Publishing, 2003
Art's Prospect: the Challenge of Tradition in an Age of Celebrity, by Roger Kimball, publ. Ivan R. Dee, 2003
New Practices, New Pedagogies, by Malcolm Miles, publ. Routledge, 2005
The Art of Nathan Joseph: Building a Picture, by Michael J. Amy & Marius Kwint, publ. Antique Collectors' Club, 2007
Creative Time: 33 years of Public Art in New York, by Anne Pasternak, Michael Brenson, Ruth A. Peltason & Lucy Lippard, publ. Princeton Architectural Press, 2007

External links
 Fvlcrvm Gallery
 Shakespeare's Fvlcrvm Gallery
 Actual Art Foundation
 : Australian National Gallery archives
 : Australian National Gallery archives
 : Australian National Gallery archives
  Video by Richard Currier on YouTube

Visual arts genres